Cheech is a 2006 Canadian comedy-drama film directed by Patrice Sauvé (his feature film directorial debut) and written by François Létourneau, based on his own prior stage play Cheech, ou Les hommes de Chrysler sont en ville. The film showed at the 2006 Toronto International Film Festival.

Plot 
Ron runs an escort service in a rundown part of Montreal. His murder leads to suspicion of a number of suspects. They include Cheech, the rival escort agency owner, and Stephanie, a prostitute who wants to leave the business. The film captures a day in the life of six people whose lives intersect in unexpected ways. Their quest for happiness will reveal each of them to one another in ways they never dreamed of.

Recognition 

 2007 – Nominated – Genie Award for Best Adapted Screenplay (François Létourneau)
 2007 – Nominated – Genie Award for Best Achievement in Editing (Michel Grou)
 2007 – Nominated – Genie Award for Best Achievement in Music - Original Score (Normand Corbeil)
 2007 – Nominated – Genie Award for Best Achievement in Sound Editing (Pierre-Jules Audet, Guy Francoeur, Guy Pelletier)
 2007 – Nominated – CSC Award for Best Cinematography in Theatrical Feature (Yves Bélanger)

References

External links 
 Sevill Pictures website
 Telefilm Canada
 
 
 
 

2006 films
2006 comedy-drama films
2006 directorial debut films
Films about prostitution in Canada
Films based on Canadian plays
Films scored by Normand Corbeil
Films set in Montreal
Films shot in Montreal
French-language Canadian films
Canadian comedy-drama films
2000s Canadian films
2000s French-language films